Puyvert is a commune in the Vaucluse department in the Provence-Alpes-Côte d'Azur region in southeastern France.

Puyvert borders the Bouches du Rhone department, sitting on the river Durance.

The former priory of Saint-Pierre de Mejans was seized by the state during the French Revolution and is now managed as a chateau vineyard and events venue.

See also
 Côtes du Luberon AOC
Communes of the Vaucluse department
Luberon

References

Communes of Vaucluse